SMPTE 274M is a standard published by SMPTE which defines the 1080 line high definition video formats including 1080p25 and 1080p30. It is frequently carried on serial digital interface physical cables defined by the SMPTE 292M standard.

See also
 SMPTE 296M

References

Film and video technology
SMPTE standards